Indy de Vroome and Aleksandrina Naydenova were the defending champions, but both players chose not to participate.

Junri Namigata and Kotomi Takahata won the title, defeating Erina Hayashi and Robu Kajitani in an all-Japanese final, 6–0, 6–7(3–7), [10–7].

Seeds

Draw

References
Main Draw

Fukuoka International Women's Cup - Doubles
Fukuoka International Women's Cup